Arizona Public Service (APS) is the largest electric utility in Arizona, United States. Since 1985, it has been the principal subsidiary of publicly traded S&P 500 member Pinnacle West Capital Corporation, known as AZP Group until 1987. Pinnacle West Capital made a profit of $500 million in 2017.

With 4,000 MW of generating capacity, APS serves more than one million customers in 11 counties throughout most of the state, but mainly concentrated in northern and central Arizona. APS is one of the two major suppliers of electricity to the Phoenix metropolitan area (the other being Salt River Project (SRP)).

APS is regulated by the Arizona Corporation Commission (ACC), the state agency that, by mandate of Article 15, Section 2 of the state's constitution, regulates energy utilities in Arizona, with the notable exception of SRP, the rural electrical districts, and the City of Mesa electric utility serving Downtown Mesa and the immediate vicinity (with the rest of the city being served by SRP).

The holding company, Pinnacle West Capital, through its APS utility sells wholesale and retail power to the wider western United States and also provides energy-related services. Through another major subsidiary, Pinnacle West also developed and managed real estate in Arizona. Pinnacle West left the real estate business in 2010.

The utility company also operates three nuclear reactors. Its Palo Verde Nuclear Generating Station in Arizona, the largest nuclear plant in the U.S., came under scrutiny by the Nuclear Regulatory Commission in 2005 when operational problems began to cause prolonged outages.

History
In 1884, the Phoenix Light and Fuel Company was formed to provide electricity and heat to the people of the three-year-old town of Phoenix.  It changed its name to Pacific Gas and Electric Company in 1906 and to Central Arizona Light and Power in 1920.  Also in 1920, it paid a dividend, and continued the annual dividend without interruption for the next 69 years.

The company became a subsidiary of the giant conglomerate American Power and Light in 1925, but became an independent company once again in 1945.  In 1949, it merged with Northern Arizona Power and Light.  In 1952, it merged with Arizona Edison and changed its name to Arizona Public Service.

The stock doubled in price through the long bear market of the 1970s, while paying a 10% dividend yield. By then it had become an electric and natural gas utility fueled 94.4% by coal plants, 5.2% by natural gas, and 0.4% by oil. The company traded its common stock on the New York Stock Exchange, and in 1976, the company issued a preferred stock (formerly ) with a 10.5% dividend, callable in 1990.

APS also performed well through the early 1980s recession, reaching peak earnings of over US$255 million in 1983. However, by then the company had accumulated over US$2.1 billion in long-term debt.

In 1982, APS issued another preferred stock (formerly ) with an 11.9% dividend, callable in 1987. And in 1983, it issued a third preferred stock (formerly ) paying an adjustable rate between 6 and 12%, through 1986.

1984 was a down year for both earnings and the stock price, which at its low that year had lost almost half its value from the 1983 peak.

Service territory
APS serves about two-thirds of the Phoenix metropolitan area.  It primarily serves downtown and northern Phoenix, as well as a large swath to the north and east of the city. Outside of the Valley, it serves Flagstaff, Prescott, Yuma and Douglas.

Major power outage
On September 8, 2011, there was a widespread power outage affecting a region spreading west from Yuma, Arizona, to San Diego, California, and affecting parts of Northern Mexico. The outage was the result of 23 events that occurred on five power grids in a span of 11 minutes including the APS North Gila Substation.
Federal, regional and local officials are investigating what happened and why the outage cascaded the way it did.  
Most of the areas affected were served by San Diego Gas & Electric, which saw its entire service area lose power.

The outage appears to have been caused by the actions of an APS employee in the North Gila substation, and it is unknown why safeguards did not keep the outage limited to the Yuma area.

The outage occurred days before the tenth anniversary of the September 11 attacks, and hours before the United States Department of Homeland Security warned of a potential terrorist attack leading up to the anniversary, but the Federal Bureau of Investigation and SDG&E early in their investigations ruled out terrorism.

Blackout settlement
On July 7, 2014, APS agreed to a $3.25 million settlement with NERC and FERC related to the September 2011 blackout.

2018 Street Protests
On September 7, 2018, APS cut off the power to 72-year-old retiree Stephanie Pullman, due to an overdue electric bill. The same day, the temperature in Phoenix hit . Within a week, Pullman had died from heat exposure. Her death sparked statewide media coverage and street protests over APS's disconnect policy. The incident led to Arizona regulators banning power shutoffs on hot summer days.

Solar Generation
As of 2016, APS has available one gigawatt of solar generating capacity.  Approximately half is generated at large solar power stations and half at small rooftop solar systems.

See also

Path 46, also called West of Colorado River, Arizona-California West-of-the-River Path (WOR)
Palo Verde Nuclear Generating Station
Four Corners Generating Station

References

External links
APS official site

History of Arizona
Public utilities established in 1920
Companies based in Phoenix, Arizona
Electric power companies of the United States
Nuclear power companies of the United States